A Fable is the fourth album by Tigran Hamasyan released in February 2011. Tigran uses traditional Armenian hymns, Armenian poetry and Armenian folk music as the basis for the tracks on the album. The album also draws influences from Jazz, Rock and Pop. Tigran in an interview said that he chose the name of the album "... because each composition tells a story ... [and] people can relate to fables because they are both simple, yet deep." He only used his first name on this album's release, but has used his full name in subsequent albums.

Track listing

References 

2011 albums
Verve Records albums
EmArcy Records albums
Tigran Hamasyan albums